The 2012 Seguros Bolívar Open Medellín was a professional tennis tournament played on clay courts. It was the ninth edition of the tournament which was part of the 2012 ATP Challenger Tour. It took place in Medellín, Colombia between October 29 and November 4, 2012.

Singles main draw entrants

Seeds

 1 Rankings are as of October 22, 2012.

Other entrants
The following players received wildcards into the singles main draw:
  Juan Sebastián Cabal
  Felipe Escobar
  Kevin Kim
  Michael Quintero

The following players received entry from the qualifying draw:
  Ruben Gonzales
  Chris Letcher
  Martin Rios-Benitez
  Steffen Zornosa

Champions

Singles

 Paolo Lorenzi def.  Leonardo Mayer, 7–6(7–5), 6–7(4–7), 6–4

Doubles

 Nicholas Monroe /  Simon Stadler def.  Renzo Olivo /  Marco Trungelliti, 6–4, 6–4

External links
 Official Website

Seguros Bolivar Open Medellin
Seguros Bolívar Open Medellín
2012 in Colombian tennis